Mandirola is a genus of flowering plants belonging to the family Gesneriaceae.

It is native to Bolivia and Brazil.

The genus name of Mandirola is in honour of Agostino Mandirola (d. 1661), Italian clergyman, naturalist and botanist with a focus on medicinal plants and citrus. 
It was first described and published in Rev. Hort. (Paris), sér.3, Vol.2 on page 468 in 1848.

Known species
According to Kew:
Mandirola hirsuta 
Mandirola ichthyostoma 
Mandirola rupestris

References

Gesnerioideae
Gesneriaceae genera
Plants described in 1848
Flora of Bolivia
Flora of Brazil
Taxa named by Joseph Decaisne